George Tucker may refer to:
St. George Tucker (1752—1827), professor of law at College of William & Mary
George Tucker (politician) (1775–1861), U.S. Representative and author
George Tucker (priest) (1835–1908), Archdeacon of Bermuda
George Loane Tucker (1872–1921), American film director and screenwriter
George Tucker (musician) (1927–1965), jazz bassist
George Tucker (American football) (1929–2013), American football coach
George Tucker (luger) (born 1947), Puerto Rican physicist and former Olympic luger
George Tucker, a character portrayed by Scott Porter on Hart of Dixie